Legionario is a Spanish independent film directed by Eduardo H. Garza. It is his first feature and he also produced it besides his wife Sylvia Vivanco. The film had a worldwide digital release on VOD in 33 territories.

The film is also available on SVOD platforms around the world. It's been said that the film was done a tight budget but looks of a higher one.

Plot 
The morning after his homecoming party from his last tour in Afghanistan, a Spanish special forces soldier wakes up besides the corpse of a young woman, who is not his fiancée. Desperate to find his girl he decides to look for her knowing that he could be accused of a murder that seems like the perfect setup.

Production Details 
In the film stars Raúl Tejón, Diana Palazón and Luis Mottola. It was shot during August 2014 and was finished by the filmmaker in December 2016.

The Afghan town scenes was shot in the outskirts of Madrid on a paintball zone that was covered with chroma screens in order to replace the background in postproduction. The main story was shot on the known building in the city of Madrid called "Torre Metropolitana" which is a 24-story building. The Matte paintings and some aerial shots were done in the south of the island of Gran Canaria.

The Spanish Army collaborated with the filmmakers by letting them shoot inside two of their bases. El Goloso and la FAMET. Where the filmmakers had the chance to use URO VAMTAC vehicles and flew on Spanish Army's Chinook helicopters for some of their scenes.

Reception 
This film has gathered mixed reviews. Making an average of 3 stars (out of five stars).

References

External links